Opdam is a surname. Notable people with the surname include: 

Amanda Obdam (born 1993), Thai actress and beauty pageant titleholder
Barry Opdam (born 1976), Dutch footballer
Eric M. Opdam (born 1960), Dutch mathematician
Jacob van Wassenaer Obdam (1610-1665), Dutch admiral
Johannes Opdam (1916-1983), Dutch murderer
Levi Opdam (born 1996), Dutch footballer